Station days were days of fasting in the early Christian Church, associated with a procession to certain prescribed churches in Rome, where the Mass and Vespers would be celebrated to mark important days of the liturgical year. Although other cities also had similar practices, and the fasting is no longer prescribed, the Roman churches associated with the various station days are still the object of pilgrimage and ritual, especially in the season of Lent.

Ancient practice
Station days grew out of the early Christian practice of visiting the tombs of the martyrs and celebrating the Eucharist at those sites. By the fourth century, the practice of carrying out an itinerary to various churches of the city began to develop during the days of Lent. In those days it became a tradition for the pope to visit a church in each part of the city and celebrate Mass with the congregation.

In the early centuries, the Lenten fast lasted all day, and so towards the evening, the Christians of Rome would begin to gather at a church known as the collecta ("gathering place"), where they would be joined by the assembled clergy of the city and the pope. The procession would then move through the streets to the station church, not far away. Having gathered at the daily statio ("standing place"), the pope would then celebrate a solemn Mass, and fragments of the Host were sent to the other stationes of the city in order to symbolize the unity of the city around its bishop. After the conclusion of Vespers, the day's fast was broken with a communal meal.

In the earliest form of the Lenten itinerary, only about twenty-five churches were assigned as stationes. More precisely, the statio was defined not as the church building, but the relics of the martyr whose relics were housed within. (For example, rather than "Station at the Basilica of St. Anastasia", the station was considered to be "at St. Anastasia" herself.)

In the sixth century, Pope Gregory the Great fixed the classic order of these stations, and confirmed the tradition that the more solemn festivals of the liturgical year should be marked with the standard practices: assembling at Sext, continuing in procession to the statio, celebrating the Eucharistic liturgy, and finishing with Vespers.

The practice of keeping stations continued beyond Lent into Eastertide. The stations for the Easter season proceeded in order of sanctity: from St. John Lateran, which is dedicated to Christ, the Savior, for the Easter Vigil, to St. Mary Major on Easter day, to the shrines of principal patrons of the city over the next three days: St. Peter, St. Paul, and St. Lawrence.

Liturgical influence
The stational liturgy of the early Roman Church had an important part in determining the various readings for strong liturgical seasons, such as Lent. For example, in the pre-1970 Missal, the Gospel for the Thursday after Ash Wednesday was always Matthew 8:5–13, the healing of the centurion's servant. This reading was almost certainly chosen because the station of that day was San Giorgio in Velabro, where the relics of the soldier-saint George are kept. Likewise, the station at Sant'Eusebio on Friday of the Fourth Week of Lent recalls the Gospel of that day, the raising of Lazarus, given the proximity of that church to the cemetery on the Esquiline.

In addition to their influence on the lectionary, the station churches also left traces in the other texts of the Mass. A prominent example is the petition for "the protection of the Doctor of the Gentiles" (i.e. Saint Paul) in the collect of Sexagesima. This petition reflects the gathering of the Roman faithful at the Basilica of Saint Paul outside the Walls on Sexagesima Sunday.

It should also be noted that for the early centuries of the Roman Church, Mass was never celebrated on Thursdays. Therefore, when the liturgy began to be celebrated on that day in the eighth century, new stations were added to the list which are later than the original stations as defined by Gregory the Great.

Modern revival

The practice of keeping stations gradually waned in Rome, starting after the Gregorian reforms of the eleventh century began to place more emphasis on the pope as administrator, and papal liturgies began to be celebrated in private, rather than among the people of the city. The keeping of stations ceased entirely during the Avignon papacy, and left their trace only as notations in the Roman Missal.

After the Lateran Treaty of 1929 solved the Roman Question, Pope Pius XI and Pius XII encouraged a return to the ancient tradition by attaching indulgences for visiting the station churches of Lent and Easter. Concrete gestures on the part of Pope John XXIII and Paul VI also began a revival, as John XXIII was the first pope in modern times to celebrate Ash Wednesday at Santa Sabina, and Paul VI visited Sant'Eusebio on its station day in 1967.

The greatest impetus towards the recovery of the ancient tradition, however, has been the student-organized station church program put on by the Pontifical North American College. The North American College has coordinated a public station Mass in English at all the station churches of Lent, from Monday to Saturday, every year since 1975. In recent years, the Diocese of Rome too hosts Italian-language Lenten station Masses at the traditional evening hour.

Seven Church Walk
In addition to the station churches, a long-standing Roman custom is to visit the four major basilicas and the three of the more important minor basilicas, in what is commonly called the Seven Church Walk. This is traditionally done on Wednesday of Holy Week.  Outside of that day, the Church allows for the following indulgence:

A plenary indulgence is granted the Christian faithful who devoutly visit one of the four patriarchal basilicas in Rome and there recite the Our Father and the Creed:  1) on the basilica's titular feast; 2) on Sundays and the other 10 holy days of obligation 3) once a year or on any other day chosen by the individual Christian faithful.

Indulgences
The fourth edition of the Enchiridion Indulgentiarum (1999) lists the following as an opportunity for the faithful to obtain a plenary indulgence:

Station churches of Lent and the Easter Octave
On some days, the list of stations has more than one church. The original reason was simply that the crowds would be too large to handle if only one church was used, so an alternate was also designated. In such cases, the most important (i.e., the original traditional station) is listed first, but indulgences can still be gained by attending the alternate. In a few cases the original station has been destroyed (for example, when the station at San Trifone was transferred to Sant'Agostino). Also in the 1930s two churches were raised to stational status by the Pope, as "alternates", by reason of their importance.

The following list of collect and station churches for Lent is taken from Mabillon's Ordo Romanus XVI, which for the most part, is still current. If changes have occurred, such as in cases when the original church is destroyed, the current station is provided. The stations for the Easter Octave are taken from what is provided in the Roman Missal.

Table notes

Stations of other liturgical seasons
The station churches outside of Lent did not have collect churches.

Stations of Advent

Stations of Christmastide

Stations of Ember and Rogation Days

Stations of other days

Notes and references
Notes

References

Works cited

 
 
 

Catholic liturgy
Lent
 Station Days